"Johnny Reggae" is a 1971 novelty song credited to The Piglets. The single cover states that it was "conceived, created, produced and directed by Jonathan King". It was released on Bell Records.

King himself has explained in comments on his YouTube channel and in his autobiography 65 My Life So Far that the vocalists were session singers "coached to sound like teenage scrubbers", and that the lead vocalist was session singer Barbara Kay, who also recorded as Kay Barry for Embassy Records.

The lead vocals have been at various times been incorrectly attributed to Adrienne Posta or Wendy Richard.

A follow-up single "This is Reggae" was released in 1972.

Track list
Side A: "Johnny Reggae"
Side B: Backing track (of the song)

Chart positions

References

1971 songs
1971 singles
Jonathan King songs
Songs written by Jonathan King
Novelty songs
British reggae songs
Bell Records singles
Song recordings produced by Jonathan King